CHINOPERL: Journal of Chinese Oral and Performing Literature, formerly CHINOPERL Papers and CHINOPERL News, is a peer-reviewed American academic journal dedicated to the study of Chinese performing arts like quyi and xiqu (Chinese opera). It is the only western-language journal devoted to this field.

The acronym CHINOPERL for Chinese Oral and Performing Literature was coined by Yuen Ren Chao.

History
The CHINOPERL (Chinese Oral and Performing Literature) organization was founded in 1969 by a group of sinologists which included Yuen Ren Chao and his daughter Rulan Chao Pian, Nicholas Bodman, Milena Dolezelova, and Wolfram Eberhard, during a meeting at Cornell University. Its official publication was initially a newsletter titled CHINOPERL News. In 1976 it became a journal titled CHINOPERL Papers, and in 2013 it was renamed CHINOPERL: Journal of Chinese Oral and Performing Literature when it first published under Maney Publishing. (Maney was purchased by Taylor & Francis in 2016.) In 2020, the University of Hawaiʻi Press began to publish this journal.

See also
Asian Theatre Journal

External links
 CHINOPERL at Project MUSE

References

English-language journals
University of Hawaiʻi Press academic journals
Chinese studies journals
Publications established in 1969
Arts journals
Chinese opera
Chinese storytelling